Moosewood Restaurant (January 3, 1973–present) is an American natural foods restaurant in Ithaca, New York. While both the restaurant (and many of the cookbooks) included pescetarian dishes among its otherwise   vegetarian and vegan offerings in the past, it does not currently serve seafood. In 1978, the original founders sold the restaurant to the staff, who became "The Moosewood Collective." In addition to producing a number of cookbooks (by the Moosewood Collective), The Moosewood Restaurant won the America's Classics award from the James Beard Foundation in 2000, which recognized it as "one of the most popular regional destinations."

Overview
Moosewood Restaurant opened on January 3, 1973 during the natural foods and Farm-to-table movements within the American counterculture. According to the self-published 1974 Moosewood Cookbook (created by staff members), the name was inspired by Patrick, one of the original founders, "who once read a book and in it was a character-a dog in fact' named Moosewood; it is also the name of a lovely striped maple tree." Its original goal was to provide dishes made of "local, sustainable" food. Although meat was served when the restaurant first opened, it was dropped from the menu. The focus turned to natural foods that primarily featured vegetarian (and later vegan) dishes, but has also included pescetarian options on its menu and in its cookbooks.

Moosewood has "maintained a structure where those who worked there also collectively owned and managed the place." In addition, over the decades the members have continued a founding ideology of social justice: "Moosewood also holds benefit brunches, donating their labor, dining rooms, and good cooking, while the beneficiaries work to sell the tickets. The beneficiary agency folks help serve food and clear tables. Ithaca Bakery and GreenStar frequently donate bagels and cupcakes. Over 150 organizations such as the Ithaca Health Alliance, Multicultural Resource Center, Ithaca Shakespeare Society, Akila Leadership Institute of Rwanda, Council on U.S.-Latin American Relations, Planned Parenthood, and the former Ithaca Breast Cancer Alliance have been beneficiaries. Moosewood folks also contribute food, time, and expertise to community events and organizations such as Ithaca's Cool School Food Program and Taste of the Nation/Share our Strength."

It was popular with countercultural icons: "Crosby and Nash once shared drinks at the bar, and Allen Ginsberg ended his dinner with a Moosewood brownie and black coffee. Even the Grateful Dead stopped by during their trip for Cornell's Barton Hall show, only to go unrecognized by the members of the collective."

According to the Moosewood Restaurant website, the restaurant was founded by David Hirsch and Ned Asta, and is a "pioneer in plant-forward cuisine and the farm-to-table philosophy...the restaurant's idealism and political commitment to operate as a 'worker managed - worker owned' business structure became a model that has been adapted by cooperatives globally." In addition, the restaurant is a "pioneer in 'farm-to-table' sourcing and vegetarian-ish eating (they always served fish and seafood)."

History

1970s
Moosewood was established in "the ground level of the Dewitt Building at 215 N. Cayuga St," and sits "[in the] southeast corner of the building [...] its décor included barn board wainscoting, fifteen wooden tables, mix-matched chairs, and tie-dyed curtains." The founders originally developed the restaurant as “a place to feed their community. The vision was to put forward ideas about sustainable farming and environmentally friendly food systems but to do so in a delicious way." It was also set up to:

Wynnie Stein, an original Moosewood member, states she became involved due to the emphasis on local ingredients: "it's important for people to know where their food was produced. I saw Moosewood's Collective involvement in this locally sourced foods movement and I am so glad to be a part of it. It's refreshing to be part of a group of individuals who support the use of locally produced fruits, vegetables, and grains." Stein also notes that the "first people who were involved were very idealistic, none of them had any restaurant experience. They were just great cooks and they loved to cook... we were really interested in food being not just helpful or good for you, but super creative and delicious, and I think that's what set us apart from the rest of the natural foods movement."

In 1978, the original founders sold Moosewood to the restaurant staff, now called "The Moosewood Collective." David Hirsch (who joined Moosewood in 1976) recalls that there "were seven original owners, and by the time I started there were only two left who were still working there. Within a couple of years we bought out the original seven owners and formed it as more of a philosophical collective, because it wasn't a true cooperative economically. We would have meetings and try for consensus on different decisions that were important. We didn't have a hierarchical leadership; it was more horizontal."

New ownership (2022-present)
During the COVID-19 pandemic, the members of the collective began to explore selling Moosewood. Danica Wilcox (the daughter of Kip Wilcox, an original member of Moosewood who specialized in desserts) eventually bought it, and  original Moosewood member Wynnie Stein worked with her to make the transition. 

Wilcox took over as of January 1, 2022, and has launched a new menu that will be "more vegan, more local and sustainable." She also notes that while Moosewood's "menu has often included fish throughout the years – which we may reintroduce – ...our focus right now is to highlight the beautiful produce, grains, dairy and wine available in our region...the first new menu celebrates authentically vegetarian cuisine.”

Cookbooks

Moosewood Restaurant
In 1974, members of the original Moosewood staff self- published a spiral bound paper-covered vegetarian cookbook, with "The Moosewood Cookbook Recipes from Moosewood Restaurant in the Dewitt Mall, Ithaca, New York" on the title page. Page three contains a list of its creators: "Design, Editing, Hand-writing, Pen-and-ink illustrations Mollie Katzen Feedback digestion, Critical Analysis, Introduction & History Nancy McCauley Cover Drawing Judith M. Barringer Onion Photogram Kathy Morris Frontispiece: charcoal drawing Meredith (Mimi) Barchat Photographs Phyllis Boudreau Photographic Montage Phyllis Boudreau Susan B. Lent." In addition, the Postward on page 79 states:"we have only presented our original recipes in this book," and offers a list of their "favorite cookbooks" that served as "our sources of inspiration." The list includes: Diet for a Small Planet, Recipes for a Small Planet, The Yogi Cookbook (Yogi Vithaldas and Susan Roberts), Ten Talents, The Vegetarian Epicure, Sunset Mexican Cookbook, and The Joy of Cooking.

Moosewood Cookbook
In 1977, Ten Speed Press in California published a revised version of the 1974 self-published original, with "The Moosewood Cookbook Recipes from Moosewood Restaurant Ithaca, New York Compiled, Edited, Illustrated and Hand-Lettered by Mollie Katzen" on the title page. Page five lists additional contributors: "Frontspiece: Charcoal Drawing by Meridith Barchat Photographs by J.M. Barringer Cover Design by Meridith Barchat and Mollie Katzen." This page also contains a list of 37 names (including Katzen) introduced as: "The Moosewood People who have created the Moosewood Restaurant in Ithaca, New York from which this book has sprung." 

The Moosweood Cookbook became a highly influential vegetarian cookbook, with four editions (1977, 1992, 2000, 2014).

Moosewood Collective
Beginning in the late 1980s, The Moosewood Collective began a cookbook series. The first, published in 1987, is titled New Recipes From Moosewood Restaurant. Mollie Katzen states in a quote on the back cover: "It's been nearly ten years since I cooked at Moosewood Restaurant, and I had no hand making this book, yet these recipes evoke memories so fresh, it feels like I worked there yesterday."  New Recipes From Moosewood Restaurant has been followed by thirteen more books of vegetarian, vegan, and Pescetarian recipes to date. A share of cookbook royalties have gone to various charities: "Ithaca Community Harvest, Planned Parenthood, AIDS Work of Tompkins County, Eritrean Relief Fund, Tibetan Resettlement Project, Greater Ithaca Activities Center, Loaves & Fishes, and Healthy Food for All." In 2014, the Collective donated "a copy of Moosewood Cooks for a Crowd cookbook to youth and adult secure facility/prisons, plus local schools, community centers and organizations, and spiritual centers throughout New York State."

In 2010, the Moosewood Collective donated its archive of original cookbook manuscripts and memorabilia to Cornell University. The papers are housed in the Division of Rare and Manuscript Collections in the Carl A. Kroch Library.

Includes lists of vegan dishes

50th anniversary edition (2023)
The new owners of the Moosewood Restaurant will be releasing a 50th anniversary edition cookbook in 2023.

James Beard awards and nominations

Moosewood Restaurant
Winner:
2000 (America's Classics: Chef and Restaurant Awards): Moosewood Restaurant. This award recognized Moosewood Restaurant as "one of the most popular regional destinations."

The Moosewood Collective
Six of The Moosewood Collective cookbooks were nominated for James Beard Foundation Awards, and two of the six won awards.

Winners: 
1995: Moosewood Restaurant Cooks at Home - (Vegetarian Book Awards)
1997: Moosewood Restaurant Low-Fat Favorites (Healthy Focus Book Awards)

Nominations
1991: Sundays at Moosewood Restaurant
1997: Moosewood Cooks for a Crowd
2002: Moosewood Restaurant New Classics
2004: Moosewood Restaurant Celebrates

Moosewood Cookbook
Winner:
2007 (Cookbook Hall of Fame: Book Awards): Moosewood Cookbook

Further reading

See also
Chez Panisse
Greens Restaurant

References

External links

Ithaca Week: Moosewood Reopens Under New Ownership (video), April 19, 2022

Buildings and structures in Ithaca, New York
Counterculture of the 1960s
James Beard Foundation Award winners
Restaurants established in 1973
Tourist attractions in Ithaca, New York
Vegetarian cookbooks
Vegetarian cookbook writers
Chefs of vegan cuisine
Vegan cookbooks
Vegan cookbook writers
Vegetarian restaurants in the United States
Vegan restaurants in the United States
Worker cooperatives of the United States